Jashbhai Maganbhai Patel College of Commerce is an educational institution located in Goregaon (West), Mumbai, India. It is also known as Sanskardham Kelvani Mandal's Jashbhai Maganbhai Patel College of Commerce (SKM JMPC).

The Sanskardham Kelavani Mandal (S.K.M.) was established in the year 1959 by (Late) Shri. Govindjibhai Shroff. SKM's all the institutions are situated on a sprawling campus of about 2.09 acres of land situated at Goregaon (W) near the Link road connecting Andheri and Dahisar.

SKM's Jashbhai Maganbhai Patel College of Commerce was started in the year 1988.

External links

Universities and colleges in Mumbai
Colleges in India